"Betcha She Don't Love You" is a song by American singer Evelyn King, released by RCA Records as the second single from her fifth album Get Loose (1982), the follow-up to "Love Come Down". The song was written and co-produced by American musician Kashif and talks about a boy going out with another girl who will break his heart. It reached number two on the US Billboard Black Singles chart and number 49 on the Hot 100 chart. A 12" extended mix of this song was included on King's Greatest Hits album.

Charts

Weekly charts

Sampling
In 1999, this song was sampled in "Bet She Don't Love You" by A+ featuring Joe. The song was also sampled in the song "If You Were My Man" by Monica on her 2010 album Still Standing.

References

External links
WhoSampled.com
 

Evelyn "Champagne" King songs
1981 songs
1982 singles
Songs written by Kashif (musician)
RCA Records singles